The Poetic Republic Poetry Prize  was an open online poetry competition judged by the community of entrants.  It was active from 2009 to 2015, when the death of the organiser Peter Hartey led to its closure.  The 2015 event closed before the results were announced but anthologies drawn from the submission were published.

The name of the Poetry Prize was changed from MAG Poetry Prize to Poetic Republic Poetry Prize for the 2012 event.
The Poetry Prize 2012 and the Poetry Prize 2011 were supported by Arts Council England.

The Poetry Prize 2009 launched with no fixed prize fund. The prize fund accumulated in proportion to the number of entries. In 2011 this system was replaced by a guaranteed prize fund. The first three years of the Poetry Prize supported Mines Advisory Group with a donation of £1 per entry.

References

External links 
Site of the Week, Manchester Evening News December 2008
Local Novelist Wins Poetry Competition, Harlow Herald August 2009
Write Out Loud August 2009
Join the people's panel, Writing Magazine September 2009 Feature describing the judging process from the point of view of an entrant. Available only in printed magazine.

Awards established in 2008
British poetry awards